Season 1998–99 was a successful season for Hibernian F.C as the club got promoted at the first attempt & with a record points total following the relegation suffered in 1998. There was disappointment in the cup competitions, however, as the club were beaten by Stirling Albion in the Scottish Cup, and were hammered 4–0 by St Johnstone in the League Cup. As a First Division club, Hibs would have entered the Scottish Challenge Cup, but the competition was not played during the 1998–99 season due to a lack of sponsorship.

League season

Results

Final table

Scottish League Cup

Results

Scottish Cup

Results

Transfers

Players In

Players Out

Loans In

Loans Out

Player stats

During the 1998–99 season, Hibs used 34 different players in competitive games. The table below shows the number of appearances and goals scored by each player. Goalkeeper Olafur Gottskalksson played in every competitive match.

|}

See also
List of Hibernian F.C. seasons

Notes

External links
Hibernian 1998/1999 results and fixtures , Soccerbase

Hibernian F.C. seasons
Hibernian